N79 may refer to:

Roads 
 Route nationale 79, in France
 N79 highway, in the Philippines
 Nebraska Highway 79, in the United States

Other uses 
 N79 (Long Island bus)
 , a submarine of the Royal Navy
 Northumberland County Airport, in Pennsylvania, United States
 Nokia N79, a smartphone